"The Three Questions" is a 1903 short story by Russian author Leo Tolstoy as part of the collection What Men Live By, and Other Tales. The story takes the form of a parable, and it concerns a king who wants to find the answers to what he considers the three most important questions in life.

Synopsis:
A king determines that he will be able to cope with any occurrence if he has the answers to three critical questions:

What is the best time to begin everything?
Who are the best people to listen to?
What is the most important thing to do?
Many educated men attempted to answer the king's questions, but they all came up with different answers. The king decided that he needed to ask a wise hermit in a nearby village. The hermit would only see common folk, however, so the king disguised himself as a peasant and left his guards behind to see the hermit. The hermit was digging flower beds when the king arrived. The king asked his questions, but the hermit went on digging rather laboriously. The king offered to dig for him for a while. After digging for some time, the king again asked his questions. Before the hermit could answer, a man emerged from the woods. He was bleeding from a terrible stomach wound. The king tended to him, and they stayed the night in the hermit's hut. By the next day, the wounded man was doing better but was incredulous at the help he had received. The man confessed that he knew who the king was and that the king had executed his brother and seized his property. He had come to kill the king, but the guards wounded him in the stomach. The man pledged allegiance to the king, asked for forgiveness and  went on his way. The king asked the hermit again for his answers, and the hermit responded that he had just had his questions answered.

The most important time is now.
The most important person is whoever you are with.
The most important thing is help the person you are with.

See also

Bibliography of Leo Tolstoy
Twenty-Three Tales

External links
 Complete Text Online, as translated by Louise Maude and Aylmer Maude
 "The Three Questions", from RevoltLib.com
 "The Three Questions", from Marxists.org
The Three Questions at The Literature Network

References

"The Works of Tolstoi."  Black's Readers Service Company: Roslyn, New York.  1928.

1903 short stories
Short stories by Leo Tolstoy
Parables